2,4-Diaminotoluene is an organic compound with the formula C6H3(NH2)2CH3. It is one isomer of six with this formula. It is a white solid although commercial samples are often yellow-tan.

Preparation
It is prepared by hydrogenation of 2,4-dinitrotoluene using a nickel catalyst.  Commercial samples often contain up to 20% of the 2,6-isomer.

A laboratory method involves reduction of 2,4-dinitrotoluene with iron powder.

Use
It is mainly used as a precursor to toluene diisocyanate, a precursor to polyurethane. It is as well a degradation product of polyurethane materials produced using toluene diisocyanate.  

Its reaction with benzenediazonium chloride gives the cationic azo dye Basic Orange 1.   Condensation of 2,4-diaminotoluene with acetaldehyde gives the acridine dye called Basic Yellow 9.

References 

Anilines
Diamines
Monomers
Alkyl-substituted benzenes